Barbara A. Bintliff was the Joseph C. Hutcheson Professor and Director of the Tarlton Law Library/Jamail Center for Legal Research at University of Texas School of Law, and was previously the Nicholas Rosenbaum Professor of Law and Director of the William A. Wise Law Library at University of Colorado.

References

Year of birth missing (living people)
Living people
University of Texas at Austin faculty
American lawyers
University of Colorado faculty